Bendita mentira (English: Blessed Lie) is a Mexican telenovela produced by Carlos Moreno Laguillo for Televisa in 1996. It premiered on Canal de las Estrellas on August 5, 1996 and ended on December 6, 1996.

Angélica María, Mariana Levy and Sergio Catalán starred as protagonists, while Ana Patricia Rojo starred as main antagonist.

Plot 
Esperanza is a woman who works as a housekeeper at the home of the family de la Mora, where his son Diego Mora lives, but he has grown up believing that the Mora are their parents. Diego is a boy of society, accustomed to luxuries and live life irresponsibly. The relationship between him and Hope is very hostile, he humiliates and despises her for being a simple employee. On the contrary Carolina is a beautiful young woman who lives in a modest home with his mother Goya and his sister Margarita, that help and support.

Cast 
 
Angélica María as Esperanza Martinez de de la Mora
Mariana Levy as Carolina
Sergio Catalán as Diego de la Mora
Ana Patricia Rojo as Mireya de la Mora
Ramón Abascal as Fabricio de la Mora
Marisol Mijares as Liliana "Lili" de la Mora
Joel Núñez as Saúl de la Mora
Constantino Costas as David Grajales/Teo
Mariana Karr as Mariana
Alejandra Meyer as Petronila
Angélica Vale as Margarita
Zully Keith as Flora
José María Torre as Benny
Karla Graham as Jessica
Evita Muñoz "Chachita" as Goya
Héctor Gómez as Don Erasmo de la Mora
Guillermo Aguilar as Fernando Zambrano
Socorro Avelar as Veneranda
María Idalia as Julia
Marina Marín as Gloria
Alicia Montoya as Virtudes
Gabriela Murray as Aurora
Julio Monterde as Benjamín
Maty Huitrón as Ramona
Guillermo Rivas as Father Roque
Susana Lozano as Maripaz
Beatriz Martínez as Amelia
Sergio Sánchez as Edgardo
Riccardo Dalmacci as Angelo Fontanelli
María Prado as Ruperta
Rubén Morales as Ramiro
Salvador Ibarra as Agustín
Plutarco Haza as Dr. Sandoval
Fabián Ibarra as Omar
Fernando Torres Lapham
Dolores Solana
Luis Ferrer
Luis Bernardos
Moulay Peralta
José Luis Sedeno
Susana Ruiz
Arturo Lorca
Luis Ferrer
Jesús Carrasco
Néstor Leoncio

Awards

References

External links

1996 telenovelas
Mexican telenovelas
1996 Mexican television series debuts
1996 Mexican television series endings
Spanish-language telenovelas
Television shows set in Mexico
Televisa telenovelas